Cape Girardeau Public Schools is the school district serving Cape Girardeau, Missouri.

The district includes the vast majority of Cape Girardeau, as well as the majority of Dutchtown and small sections of Jackson and Scott City.

The City of Cape Girardeau annexed over 50% of the Kage School District territory in 1967.

Schools
Senior high schools:
 Central Senior High School

Junior high schools: 
 Central Junior High School

Middle schools: 
 Central Middle School

Elementary schools:
 Alma Schrader Elementary
 Blanchard Elementary
 Clippard Elementary
 Franklin Elementary
 Jefferson Elementary

Alternative schools:
 Career and Technology Center
 Alternative Education Center

References

External links
 Cape Girardeau Public Schools

School districts in Missouri
Education in Cape Girardeau County, Missouri
Cape Girardeau, Missouri